The Sir George Robey was a mid-19th century public house and later a music venue on Seven Sisters Road, Finsbury Park, North London, England. It was named in honour of the music hall performer Sir George Robey (1869–1954) in 1968.

The pub was a Meux's house, and was noted for a plaque advertising their Original London Stout, which remained on the building until its demise, long after the brewery's closure in 1921.

During its time as a music venue, artists who performed at the Sir George Robey include Bad Manners, Billy Bragg, Carter USM, Desmond Dekker, Fairport Convention, Gong, Hawkwind, Bert Jansch, Roy Harper, Ralph McTell, They Might Be Giants, Fugazi and Tunnelmen. Blur's Damon Albarn recalled:

Live albums recorded at the venue include Steve Marriott's Packet of Three's Live at the Sir George Robey 23-10-85.  The pub also hosted punk and ska all-nighters, and 'Club Dog' acid-house nights.

After being renamed The Powerhaus in March 1996, when it was taken over by the Mean Fiddler Music Group, and later named Robey, it closed in 2004.

Despite being locally listed, the building was demolished in 2015, after a period standing derelict, during which it was occupied by squatters and had its interior fittings and floors removed. A Premier Inn hotel now occupies the site.

The pub was directly opposite another, larger, music venue, the Rainbow Theatre.

The fictitious venue The Harry Lauder in Nick Hornby's book Fever Pitch was based on The Sir George Robey. Near the end of Irvine Welsh's novel Trainspotting the characters Sick Boy and Begbie visit The Sir George Robey.

References

External links 

 Crowd-sourced concert set-lists at setlist.fm

Former pubs in London
Demolished buildings and structures in London
Squats in the United Kingdom
Evicted squats
Pubs in the London Borough of Haringey
Buildings and structures demolished in 2015